Live in Buenos Aires may refer to:

 Live in Buenos Aires (Coldplay album)
 Live in Buenos Aires 1979, an album by Bill Evans

See also
 That One Night: Live in Buenos Aires, an album by Megadeth
 Certifiable: Live in Buenos Aires, an album and concert video by The Police